This is a list of rivers in the U.S. state of Vermont, sorted by drainage basin, and ordered from lower to higher, with the towns at their mouths:

Connecticut River 

The Connecticut River flows south towards Long Island Sound in Connecticut. Flowing into it are:
 Deerfield River, Greenfield, Massachusetts
 Green River, Greenfield, Massachusetts
 Glastenbury River, Somerset
 Fall River, Greenfield, Massachusetts
 Whetstone Brook, Brattleboro, Vermont
 West River, Brattleboro
 Rock River, Newfane
 Wardsboro Brook, Jamaica
 Winhall River, Londonderry
 Utley Brook, Londonderry
 Saxtons River, Westminster
 Williams River, Rockingham
 Middle Branch Williams River, Chester
 Black River, Springfield
 Mill Brook, Windsor
 Ottauquechee River, Hartland
 Barnard Brook, Woodstock
 Broad Brook, Bridgewater
 North Branch Ottauquechee River, Bridgewater
 White River, White River Junction
 First Branch White River, South Royalton
 Second Branch White River, North Royalton
 Third Branch White River, Bethel
 Tweed River, Stockbridge
 West Branch White River, Rochester
 Ompompanoosuc River, Norwich
 West Branch Ompompanoosuc River, Thetford
 Waits River, Bradford
 South Branch Waits River, Bradford
 Wells River, Wells River 
 Stevens River, Barnet
 Passumpsic River, Barnet 
 Joes Brook, Barnet
 Sleepers River, St. Johnsbury
 Moose River, St. Johnsbury
 Miller Run, Lyndonville
 Sutton River (West Branch Passumpsic River tributary), West Burke
 Paul Stream, Brunswick
 Nulhegan River, Bloomfield
 Leach Creek, Canaan
 Halls Stream, Beecher Falls

Saint-François River

Lake Memphremagog
Lake Memphremagog drains north via the Magog River in Quebec to the Saint-François River at Sherbrooke. Flowing into the lake are:

 Johns River, Derby
 Clyde River, Newport
 Pherrins River, Island Pond
 Black River, Newport
 Fairfield River, Fairfield
 Barton River, Newport
 Willoughby River, Orleans
 Brownington Branch, Brownington

Massawippi River
 Coaticook River, Sherbrooke, Quebec
 The Tomifobia River, which straddles the Vermont-Quebec border for a few kilometers near the village of Stanstead, Quebec and eventually drains north.

Lake Champlain 

Lake Champlain drains into the Richelieu River in Québec, thence into the Saint Lawrence River, and into the Gulf of Saint Lawrence.

 Pike River, Venise-en-Québec, Québec
 Rock River, Highgate
 Missisquoi River, Swanton
 Sutton River (Missisquoi River)
 Brock River (Missisquoi River)
 Missisquoi River North
 Petite rivière Missisquoi Nord
 East Branch Missisquoi River
 Burgess Branch
 Black Creek, Sheldon
 Trout River, Berkshire
 South Branch Trout River
 Tyler Branch, Sheldon
 Mill River, Georgia
 Lamoille River, Milton
 Browns River, Fairfax
 Lee River, Jericho
 Seymour River, Cambridge
 Brewster River, Jeffersonville
 North Branch Lamoille River, Cambridge
 Gihon River, Johnson
 Green River, Wolcott
 Winooski River, Colchester/Burlington
 Huntington River, Richmond
 Little River, Waterbury
 Mad River, Middlesex
 Dog River, Montpelier
 North Branch Winooski River, Montpelier
 Stevens Branch, Montpelier
 Kingsbury Branch, East Montpelier
 Jail Branch River, Barre
 La Platte River, Shelburne
 Lewis Creek, Ferrisburg
 Little Otter Creek, Ferrisburg
 Otter Creek, Ferrisburg
 Lemon Fair River, Weybridge
 Little Lemon Fair River, Orwell
 New Haven River, Weybridge
 Middlebury River, Middlebury
 Leicester River, Leicester
 Neshobe River, Brandon
 Clarendon River, Rutland
 East Creek, Rutland
 Cold River, Clarendon
 Mill River, Clarendon
 Mettawee River, West Haven, Vermont/Whitehall, New York
 Indian River, Granville
 Poultney River, West Haven, Vermont/Whitehall, New York
 Hubbardton River, West Haven
 Castleton River, Fair Haven

Hudson River 

The Hudson River in New York drains into New York Bay.

  Hoosic River, Schaghticoke, New York
 Walloomsac River, Hoosick, New York
 Roaring Branch, Bennington
  Batten Kill, Greenwich, New York
 Green River, West Arlington
 Roaring Branch, Arlington

See also

List of rivers of the United States

Vermont
 
Rivers